Lee County is the westernmost county in the U.S. Commonwealth of Virginia. As of the 2020 census, the population was 22,173. Its county seat is Jonesville.

History 
The area of far western Virginia and eastern Kentucky supported large Archaic Native American populations. The first known Europeans to enter what is present-day Lee County were a party of Spanish explorers, Juan de Villalobos and Francisco de Silvera, sent by Hernando de Soto in 1540, in search of gold. The county was formed after the American Revolutionary War in 1792 from Russell County.  It was named for Light Horse Harry Lee, the Governor of Virginia from 1791 to 1794, who was famous for his exploits as a leader of light cavalry during the war. He was the father of Robert E. Lee, later a West Point graduate and career US Army officer who became the General in Chief of the Armies of the Confederate States during the American Civil War.

Lee County was the final front on the Kentucky Trace, now known as the Wilderness Road and The Trail of the Lonesome Pine. During the 1780s and 1790s, fortified buildings called "stations" were built along the trail for shelter from Indian raids as the settlers followed Daniel Boone's path into the Kentucky frontier. The stations in Lee County were Yoakum Station at present-day Dryden, west to Powell River and Station Creek at today's Rocky Station, then to Mump's Fort at Jonesville, followed by Prist Station, Martin's Station at Rose Hill, Chadwell Station at Chadwell Gap, Owen Station at Ewing, and finally Gibson Station, which still bears its original name. One of the largest early landowners was Revolutionary War officer and explorer Joseph Martin, after whom Martin's Station and Martin's Creek at Rose Hill are named. He divided the land and sold it as a speculator. Rose Hill was established in 1832 as the first federally recognized post office in Lee County. In 1814, parts of Lee, Russell, and Washington counties were combined to form Scott County. In 1856, parts of Lee, Russell, and Scott counties were combined to form Wise County, named after the last governor of Virginia before the Civil War.

Economy 
The economy of Lee County has been based largely on growing tobacco and mining coal. The decline of both has resulted in high unemployment in the county and a decrease in population since 1940, which was the peak. Using the slogan Where Virginia Begins, the county has attempted to increase its heritage tourism industry by emphasizing its role in the route used by settlers going west through the Cumberland Gap, at Lee County's western tip. Lee County shares Cumberland Gap National Historical Park with Kentucky and Tennessee.  Attractions listed in the park include Hensley's Settlement, the Pinnacle Overlook, the Sand Cave, and the White Rocks overlooking the towns of Ewing and Rose Hill in Virginia. Lee County is a dry county for hard liquor, although retail sales are permitted.

Geography

All of Lee County lies longitudinally west of West Virginia. The entirety of Lee County is physically closer to eight state capitals other than its own capital in Richmond: Raleigh, North Carolina; Columbia, South Carolina; Atlanta, Georgia; Nashville, Tennessee; Charleston, West Virginia; Frankfort, Kentucky; Columbus, Ohio; and Indianapolis, Indiana.

Districts
The county is divided into seven districts: Jonesville, Rocky Station, Rocky Station Mineral, Rose Hill, White Shoals, Yoakum, and Yoakum Mineral. There are three towns: Pennington Gap, St. Charles, and Jonesville.

Adjacent counties
 Wise County, Virginia – northeast
 Scott County, Virginia – east
 Hancock County, Tennessee – south
 Claiborne County, Tennessee – south-southwest
 Bell County, Kentucky – west
 Harlan County, Kentucky – northwest

National protected areas
 Cumberland Gap National Historical Park (part)
 Jefferson National Forest (part)

Major routes

Demographics

2020 census

Note: the US Census treats Hispanic/Latino as an ethnic category. This table excludes Latinos from the racial categories and assigns them to a separate category. Hispanics/Latinos can be of any race.

2010 Census
As of the 2010 United States Census, there were 25,587 people living in the county. 94.2% were White, 3.7% Black or African American, 0.4% Native American, 0.2% Asian, 0.6% of some other race and 0.9% of two or more races. 1.6% were Hispanic or Latino (of any race).

According to the census 2009 estimates, there were 25,001 people, 11,587 households, and 6,852 families living in the county.  The population density was 54 people per square mile (21/km2).  There were 11,587 housing units at an average density of 25 per square mile (10/km2).  The racial makeup of the county was 96.3% White, 2.9% Black or African American, 0.2% Asian, 0.1% from other races, 0.7% of the population were Hispanic or Latino of any race.

The largest ancestry groups in Lee County include: English (14 percent), Irish (11 percent), German (9 percent), and Scottish-Irish (3 percent).

There were 9,706 households, out of which 29.0 percent had children under the age of 18 living with them, 55.0 percent were married couples living together, 11.7 percent had a female householder with no husband present, and 29.4 percent were non-families. 27.0 percent of all households were made up of individuals, and 12.1 percent had someone living alone who was 65 years of age or older.  The average household size was 2.41 and the average family size was 2.91.

In the county, the population was spread out, with 22.8 percent under the age of 18, 8.0 percent from 18 to 24, 27.5 percent from 25 to 44, 26.3 percent from 45 to 64, and 15.4 percent who were 65 years of age or older.  The median age was 40 years. For every 100 females there were 94.2 males.  For every 100 females age 18 and over, there were 91.3 males.

The median income for a household in the county was $29,889, and the median income for a family was $40,721.  The per capita income for the county was $16,317.  About 20.3 percent of families and 22.7 percent of the population were below the poverty line, including 30.1 percent of those under age 18 and 23.3 percent of those age 65 or over.

Law enforcement

The Lee County Sheriff's Office (LCSO) is currently headed by Gary B. Parsons, who has held the role since 1996, and is the longest-serving sheriff in Lee County's history.

Politics 
Voters in Lee County wavered between Democratic and Republican presidential candidates throughout much of the twentieth century. Since the beginning of the twenty-first century, the county has become more consistently Republican, voting overwhelmingly for Donald Trump in both 2016 and 2020. Republicans have consistently won local elections in recent years, as well.

Education
The Lee County School System operates eleven schools, including two high schools and one technical school.

Public high schools
 Lee High School, Jonesville
 Thomas Walker High School, Ewing

Public middle schools
 Elydale Middle School, Ewing
 Jonesville Middle School, Jonesville
 Pennington Middle School, Pennington Gap

Public elementary schools
 Dryden Elementary School, Dryden
 Elk Knob Elementary School, Pennington Gap
 Flatwoods Elementary School, Jonesville
 Rose Hill Elementary School, Rose Hill
 St. Charles Elementary School, St. Charles

Former
Pennington Elementary School, consisting of three buildings built at various times (1912, 1917, and 1937), was demolished in 1989, and a bank was constructed on its Morgan Avenue site. Three other elementary schools, Ewing, Keokee, and Stickleyville, were closed in June 2012.

Technical schools
 Lee County Career & Technical Center, Ben Hur

Communities

Towns
 Jonesville
 Pennington Gap
 St. Charles

Census-designated places
 Dryden
 Ewing
 Keokee
 Rose Hill

Other unincorporated communities
 Ben Hur
 Blackwater
 Darbyville
 Ewing
 Gibson Station
 Jasper
 Monarch
 Ocoonita
 Olinger
 Seminary
 Stickleyville
 Stone Creek
 Woodway

Notable residents 
 Frank Rowlett, cryptologist, member of the Signals Intelligence Service
 Carol Wood, mathematician 
 Campbell Slemp, congressman
 Andrew Taylor Still, founder of osteopathic medicine
 William C. Wampler, U.S. Representative
 Barry Audia, professional boxer
 Jim Pankovits, Major League Baseball player
 Elbert S. Martin, congressman
 John Preston Martin, U.S. Senator from Kentucky
 Steve Rasnic Tem, author
 Glen Morgan Williams, federal judge
 Don Newton, comic artist
 James Buchanan Richmond, congressman
 C. Bascom Slemp, congressman
 Claude Ely, singer/songwriter
 Walker Cress, Major League Baseball player
 Cynthia D Kinser, Chief Justice of the Supreme Court of Virginia
 Pete DeBusk, founder of DeRoyal Industries

See also
 Lee County Sheriff's Office (Virginia)
 National Register of Historic Places listings in Lee County, Virginia

References

External links
 Lee County Chamber of Commerce
 Lee County, Virginia
 Lee County Tourism
 The Lee County Story (A historical resource for the Lee County community) 

 
Virginia counties
1793 establishments in Virginia
Counties of Appalachia